Bala Khiyaban-e Litkuh Rural District is a rural district (dehestan) in the Central District of Amol County, Mazandaran Province, Iran. At the 2006 census, its population was 22,171, in 5,533 families. The rural district has 37 villages.

References 

Rural Districts of Mazandaran Province
Amol County